In mathematics, especially in geometry and topology, an ambient space is the space surrounding a mathematical object along with the object itself. To see why this makes a difference, consider the statement "Parallel lines never intersect." All spaces are subsets of their ambient space.

See also
 Configuration space
 Geometric space
 Manifold and ambient manifold
 Submanifolds and Hypersurfaces
 Riemannian manifolds
 Ricci curvature
 Differential form

References

Further reading

Geometry
Topology